Iridomyrmex brunneus is a species of ant in the genus Iridomyrmex. Described by Forel in 1902, the species is widespread in Australia, and is considered a household pest.

References

Iridomyrmex
Hymenoptera of Australia
Insects described in 1902